Hatria may refer to:
Hatria, an alternative spelling for the Etruscan city that is now Adria in the Veneto region of Northern Italy
Hatria, an alternative spelling for the city that is now Atri in the Abruzzo region of Central Italy